Danni Ashe (and early in her career sometimes as Danielle Ashe) (born January 16, 1968), is a retired American nude model, former erotic dancer and pornographic actress who is the founder and former CEO of Danni's Hard Drive, a pioneering adult web site. Ashe started her adult Internet site in 1995. She has been an industry advocate and testified before a government panel.

Career

Early years
Ashe was born in Beaufort, South Carolina, United States. Her naturally large breasts (cup size 32FF) contributed to her popularity as an adult performer.

Ashe began working as a stripper in Seattle, Washington.  Never finishing high school, she started stripping at the age of seventeen using a fake ID.  In an interview, Ashe once explained her career choice:  "I guess I'm an exhibitionist. But that's not quite true. Part of the reason is that I developed huge breasts at an early age and breasts are a very sexualized thing. At an early age, I was getting a lot of sexualized attention. Eventually, I just felt that stripping kind of put all that stuff out on the table."

After about five years of working in Seattle clubs, Ashe moved to Los Angeles and began modeling for men's magazines and soft-core pornographic videos.  She eventually worked as an exotic dancer in various strip clubs throughout the United States as a featured performer. This resulted in an incident in a technically non-nude club in Jacksonville, Florida. In interviews, Ashe has alleged that the club's owner and its manager persuaded her to perform a topless dance, and encouraged her to sell softcore videos of herself at the club. Ashe was subsequently arrested. Ashe pleaded guilty to "prohibited conduct" and was fined $50. Neither the club nor her agent helped her through this incident. This unpleasant experience marked a turning point in her career; Ashe never again performed as a stripper, seeking instead to work in an area where she would have more control.

Internet
Her first online activity was confined to Usenet newsgroups during late 1994 and early 1995.  In the spring of 1995 she decided to create her own website when her husband – then a senior vice president of the Landmark theater franchise – showed her his company's new website.  When she could not find anyone competent to help her design her own site as she had envisioned it, Ashe read The HTML Manual of Style and Nicholas Negroponte's Being Digital during a vacation.  On her return to the U.S., she created the Danni.com (a.k.a. Danni's Hard Drive) website in two weeks.

The site was launched in July 1995 and contained content exclusive to her. Ashe announced the website to her friends prior to traveling to New York City with her husband. News of the site spread rapidly and hours later when she reached the hotel in Manhattan, Ashe had a message from her ISP stating that the volume of traffic her site received had overloaded their servers and caused their system to shut down. Danni.com was moved to its own server, which became famous for having a "site working" light that never went out. Ashe jokingly described her server as a "hot box", and when she started charging a fee for access to the site, she named the members' area "The HotBox".

By 2001, the website had made a profit of $6.5 million the previous year, was projected to make $8 million that year, and was estimated to be worth US$30 million. She is the only woman in the world who appeared on the cover of both The Wall Street Journal and Juggs magazine. Ashe's business grew, allowing her to hire staff and models. By 2003, she had 50 full-time employees, a studio in Los Angeles, and an archive containing hundreds of thousands of photos, and thousands of hours of video.  That year, Arena magazine ranked her fourth among the "50 Most Powerful People in Porn" list. Ashe was making a million dollars a year.

Danni's Hard Drive was sold in 2004 to John Morisano.  In 2006, Penthouse Media Group Inc bought Danni.com and Video Bliss Inc. (owners of the website) for $3 million.

Recognition
In 1998 in an E! channel special titled Women of the Net it was said, "You may not know who Danni Ashe is, but when the History of the Internet is written she'll have a chapter all to herself...a true Internet innovator." Other women profiled in the documentary are Halle Berry, Sandra Bullock, Asia Carrera, Ellen DeGeneres, Gloria Estefan, Cindy Margolis, Jada Pinkett Smith, and Markie Post.

Ashe's website and exploits as an internet entrepreneur and a female executive were the subject of a 2000 book titled My Year in Smut: The Internet Escapades Inside Danni's Hard Drive by Taylor Marsh.

In August 2000, Ashe earned the status of "the most downloaded woman on the Internet" by the Guinness Book of World Records overtaking Cindy Margolis who had been given the title the previous year. Later that year the status was further supported with her image being downloaded for the billionth time on her website Danni.com.

Appearances
Ashe has appearance on several television shows and series as herself as well as a variety of minor roles in movies. The list of shows and series includes E!'s Wild On!, Talk Soup, The Howard Stern Show, The Man Show, and Frontline on PBS. Ashe's movie credits include I Can't Believe This Is Happening to Me!, Bondage on Stage, and Superheroine Double Feature.

In 1998, Ashe was featured and interviewed on an episode of The Internet Cafe.

In her February 2002 appearance on Frontline, Ashe was the subject of a May 2001 interview about the adult industry and her website. In the interview synopsis, Ashe is described as the "founder and CEO of Danni's Hard Drive, regarded as one of the most popular porn sites on the Internet..." even though "her site offers only softcore pornography and does not feature any female-male sex." In the interview, Ashe discusses her audience, what she offers them, and how she is planning for growth in her business.

In 2004, Ashe was featured as herself on the HBO documentary series Pornucopia: Going Down in the Valley in the episode titled "Women on Top" about the most powerful women in the industry.

Industry advocacy
In March 2000, Ashe testified as a panel member for the COPA Commission regarding "Marketing Adult Materials Online". Ashe's panel members included: Andrew Edmond, CEO, Flying Crocodile Inc.; Dr. Victor Cline, University of Utah; Detective LeeAnn Shirey, Seattle Police Department; FBI Supervisory Special Agent Randy Aden; FBI Special Agent Bruce Applin; Detective Daryk Rowland, Huntington Beach, CA Police Department.

Defamation lawsuit
In September 2013, Ashe filed suit against the newspaper and media outlet Daily Mail Online for an August 22, 2013, article posted under the headline "Porn Industry shuts down with immediate effect after 'female performer' tests positive for HIV" that was accompanied by an image of Ashe. In her filing, she claimed that the Daily Mail never sought permission to use her image and did not include a disclaimer or otherwise make clear that she was not the HIV-positive performer in question.

Citing millions of views and worldwide syndication of the article, Ashe was seeking US$3 million in damages. The Mail's London-based publisher Associated Newspapers, its parent A&N International Media, and its subsidiary DMGT were named as defendants. The online image was later removed and replaced with a blurry image of a different model, according to the 14-page lawsuit, but a requested retraction has not been published.

In July 2016, the U.S. 9th Circuit Court of Appeals (Los Angeles) ruled the Daily Mail had a case to answer to. In January 2017, it was reported the parties had settled out of court.

References

Notes
Roger Ebert, "Hard Driving a Hard Bargain", May 1997, retrieved 2008-07-09.
Frontline: "American Porn": Interviews: Danni Ashe, PBS, 2002.

External links

 
 
 

1968 births
Living people
American entertainment industry businesspeople
American female erotic dancers
American erotic dancers
American female adult models
American pornographic film actresses
American pornographers
American pornographic film producers
American women film producers
Women pornographic film producers
American women in business
People from Beaufort, South Carolina
Pornographic film actors from South Carolina
21st-century American women